Ehl is a locality in the commune of Sand, Bas-Rhin, close to the town of Benfeld in Grand Est, France. It is the site of the important Gallo-Roman city of Ellelum.

Geography of Bas-Rhin
Villages in Grand Est